A Christmas Carol is a 1997 American animated musical film version of the 1843 novella of the same name by Charles Dickens produced by DIC Productions, L.P. and distributed by 20th Century Fox Home Entertainment. It features eight original songs and stars the voice talents of Tim Curry, Whoopi Goldberg, Ed Asner, and Michael York. The film also features additional material such as Scrooge's pet bulldog, Debit.

The film is nowadays a property of WildBrain, which holds the rights to the DIC Movie Toons, as well as most of DIC's library.

Songs for the film were written by Megan Cavallari and David Goldsmith. The score was written by Megan Cavallari and John Campbell.

Cast
 Tim Curry as Ebenezer Scrooge
 Whoopi Goldberg as Ghost of Christmas Present
 Michael York as Bob Cratchit
 Ed Asner as Jacob Marley's Ghost
 Frank Welker as Debit
 Kath Soucie as Mrs. Cratchit, Ghost of Christmas Past and Fan
 Jodi Benson as Belle
 Sam Saletta as Boy Scrooge
 Jarrad Kritzstein as Tiny Tim
 Additional voices: John Garry, Amick Byram, Ian Whitcomb, Joe Lala, David Wagner, Bettina Bush, Jerry Houser, Sam Saletta, Alan Shearman, Jarrad Kritzstein, Cathy Riso, Sidney Miller, Kelly Lester, Anna Mathias and Judy Ovitz

Production
The animation was produced overseas by Han Yang Productions.

Release
The film was released on Nickelodeon on December 8, 2002, as part of the Nickelodeon Sunday Movie Toons. It was released on DVD by 20th Century Fox Home Entertainment on October 12, 2004. This release lacks bonus material, as well as a main menu.

Reception
Reviews for the film have been mixed to negative. Colin Jacobson of DVD Movie Guide criticized the film for its "barely living up to Saturday morning standards" animation, lack of subtlety as for its morals, its "forgettable" songs, and the inclusion of Debit, making Scrooge's later transformation "less impressive and surprising". Some of the "notable" voice cast members were also noted for their "really poor" work. Daniel W. Kelly of DVD Talk also panned the film's new material put to "attract the attention of children", as well as the animation and the songs, the latter of which were compared with the ones in Mr. Magoo's Christmas Carol. Scott G. Mignola of Common Sense Media was also thoroughly critical of the film in his review.

See also
 List of Christmas films
 List of ghost films
 Adaptations of A Christmas Carol
 List of animated feature-length films

References

External links
 

1997 direct-to-video films
1990s musical drama films
American musical drama films
1997 animated films
Films based on A Christmas Carol
1997 fantasy films
1997 films
Films based on British novels
Films with screenplays by Jymn Magon
20th Century Fox animated films
American Christmas films
American children's animated fantasy films
American direct-to-video films
American children's animated musical films
DIC Entertainment films
20th Century Fox direct-to-video films
Animated films based on novels
1990s American animated films
Animated Christmas films
1990s Christmas films
1990s musical films
1997 drama films
1990s children's animated films
1990s English-language films
1990s French films